Buena Vista High School or Buena Vista School is a public high school located in Imperial, Texas (USA) and classified as a 1A school by the UIL.   It is part of the Buena Vista Independent School District located in extreme north central Pecos County.  In 2015, the school was rated "Met Standard" by the Texas Education Agency.

Athletics
The Buena Vista Longhorns compete in these sports 

Cross Country, Volleyball, 6-Man Football, Basketball, Golf, Tennis & Track

State Titles
Girls Cross Country -
2021(1A)
Volleyball - 
1968(B), 1970(B), 1971(B), 1977(B)

Theatre
One Act Play State Champions 
1973(B)

References

External links
Buena Vista ISD
List of Six-man football stadiums in Texas

Schools in Pecos County, Texas
Public high schools in Texas